Yakshino is a rural locality (a village) in Saminskoye Rural Settlement, Vytegorsky District, Vologda Oblast, Russia. The population was 24 as of 2002. There are 2 streets.

Geography 
Yakshino is located 63 km southeast of Vytegra (the district's administrative centre) by road. Ryumino is the nearest rural locality.

References 

Rural localities in Vytegorsky District